Tricyclusa is a monotypic genus of cnidarians belonging to the monotypic family Tricyclusidae. The only species is Tricyclusa singularis.

The species is found in Western Europe.

References

Capitata
Hydrozoan genera
Monotypic cnidarian genera